Antistia may refer to:
 Antistia gens, an ancient Roman family
 Antistia (mantis), a genus of mantises
 Antistia (1st c. BCE), a Roman woman married to Pompey